Southernality is the debut studio album by American country music band A Thousand Horses. It was released on June 9, 2015 via Republic Nashville. The album includes their debut single "Smoke", which reached number 1 on Country Airplay.

Critical reception
Giving it 3.5 out of 5 stars, Thom Jurek of Allmusic wrote that "This band has been carefully molded for chart success without sacrificing its identity -- or revealing it fully, either. This album, as thoroughly enjoyable as it is, tells only part of the story. A Thousand Horses need to be witnessed live to be fully appreciated. It will be interesting to see what direction they take in the future and if that aspect of their persona is revealed on their records. For now, Southernality delivers on the band's modern country promise and warrants repeated listening."

Track listing

Personnel

A Thousand Horses
 Zach Brown - electric guitar, background vocals
 Graham DeLoach - bass guitar, background vocals
 Michael Hobby - acoustic guitar, harmonica, lead vocals
 Bill Satcher - acoustic guitar, electric guitar, background vocals

Additional Musicians
 Dave Cobb - acoustic guitar, electric guitar
 Whitney Coleman - background vocals 
 Chris Powell - drums
 Brian Purwin - keyboards, mellotron, violin
 Kristen Rogers - background vocals
 Robby Turner - steel guitar
 Michael Webb - keyboards

Chart performance
The album debuted on the Top Country Album at No. 3, selling 17,000 copies in the US.  The album has sold 50,200 copies in the US as of September 2015.

Weekly charts

Year-end charts

Singles

References

2015 debut albums
A Thousand Horses albums
Republic Records albums
Albums produced by Dave Cobb